Eardisley railway station was a station in Eardisley, Herefordshire, England. The station was opened on 30 June 1863, closed to passengers on 31 December 1962 and closed completely in 1964. The former station site, now an industrial estate, is to the south of the village, on the A4111.

References

Further reading

Disused railway stations in Herefordshire
Railway stations in Great Britain opened in 1863
Railway stations in Great Britain closed in 1962
Former Midland Railway stations
1863 establishments in England
1962 disestablishments in England